This is a list of airports in the Spratly Islands in the South China Sea.

Airports

Location

References

Further reading
  

Airports in the Spratly Islands